is a railway station located in the city of Tsuruoka, Yamagata, Japan, operated by East Japan Railway Company (JR East).

Lines
Uzen-Ōyama Station is served by the Uetsu Main Line, and is located  rail kilometers from the terminus of the line at Niitsu Station.

Station layout
The station has a single island platform connected to the station building by a footbridge. The station is unattended.

Platforms

History
Uzen-Ōyama Station was opened on December 5, 1919. With the privatization of the JNR on April 1, 1987, the station came under the control of the East Japan Railway Company. A new station building was completed in January 2011.

Surrounding area
Oyama Post Office

See also
List of railway stations in Japan

External links

 JR East Station information 

Stations of East Japan Railway Company
Railway stations in Yamagata Prefecture
Uetsu Main Line
Railway stations in Japan opened in 1919
Tsuruoka, Yamagata